Love with Flaws is a 2019 South Korean television series starring Oh Yeon-seo, Ahn Jae-hyun, Kim Seul-gi, Gu Won, and Heo Jung-min. Produced by AStory, it aired on MBC on Wednesdays and Thursdays at 21:00 (KST) from November 27, 2019, to January 16, 2020.

Synopsis
A romantic comedy story about two imperfect people who fell in love with each other. The female protagonist Joo Seo-yeon, who hates men with pretty faces believing that good looking men are nothing but trouble, basing it on her experiences growing up with her three good looking brothers, the male protagonist Lee Kang-woo, who have misconceptions about her at first, and how the people with flaws get over their prejudice.

Cast

Main
 Oh Yeon-seo as Joo Seo-yeon
 Ahn Jae-hyun as Lee Kang-woo
 Kim Seul-gi as Kim Mi-kyung
 Gu Won as Lee Min-hyuk
 Heo Jung-min as Park Hyun-soo

Supporting
 Min Woo-hyuk as Joo Won-jae
 Cha In-ha as Joo Won-suk
 Kim Jae-yong as Joo Seo-joon
 Hwang Woo-seul-hye as Lee Kang-hee
 Jang Yoo-sang as Choi Ho-dol
 Yoon Hae-young as Ms Oh
 Joo Hae-eun as Lee Joo-hee
 Shin Do-hyun as Baek Jang Mi
 Yoon Da-hoon as Kang-woo's Father
 Kim Young-ok as Chairwoman Han

Others
 Jeon Soo-kyeong as Baek Jang-mi's mother
 Lee Jung-shik as University student
 Kang Tae-oh as Oh Jung-tae (Seo-yeon's ex-boyfriend)
 Seo Woo-jin as young Joo Seo-joon
 Lee Do-yeop as Joo Seo-yeon‘s father

Ratings
In this table,  represent the lowest ratings and  represent the highest ratings.

Notes

References

External links
Love with Flaws official MBC website 
Official MBC global site

MBC TV television dramas
2019 South Korean television series debuts
2020 South Korean television series endings
Korean-language television shows
2010s South Korean television series
South Korean romantic comedy television series
Television series by AStory